The Raleigh Southwestern & Winding Creek Subdivision is a railroad line owned by CSX Transportation in the U.S. state of West Virginia. It was formerly part of the CSX Huntington East Division. It became part of the CSX Florence Division on June 20, 2016.

At its east end the line branches off the Piney Creek Subdivision, and at its west end the line becomes Norfolk Southern's Winding Gulf Branch of the Princeton–Deepwater District.

The line was completed in 1912 and connected with the Winding Gulf Branch, then part of the Virginian Railway, in 1917.

See also
 List of CSX Transportation lines

References

CSX Transportation lines